The electric car company Tesla, Inc. has faced dealership disputes in several U.S. states as a result of local laws. In the United States, direct manufacturer auto sales are prohibited in many states by franchise laws requiring that new cars be sold only by independent dealers. Tesla maintains that, to properly explain to their customers the advantages their cars have over "traditional" vehicles with an internal combustion engine, they cannot rely on third-party dealerships to handle their sales.

Corporate strategy 
Tesla has a 60% degree of vertical integration in 2016 according to Goldman Sachs. The integration includes its own sales channels and proprietary charging infrastructure, among others. The high degree is rare in the automotive industry, where companies typically focus on engine manufacturing and vehicle assembly, outsourcing 80% of components to suppliers while letting franchises serve as sales points.

Some of Tesla's stated goals are to increase the number and variety of electric vehicles (EVs) available to mainstream consumers by selling its own vehicles in company-owned showrooms and online. Tesla states that owning stores "creates an information loop from our customers straight into manufacturing and vehicle design". Tesla attempts to not make a profit on servicing cars.

Sales model

, Tesla operates more than 130 stores and galleries in the United States, and has stores and galleries in 34 other countries. It owns the stores and sells directly to customers via the internet and in non-US stores.

Tesla has a low budget for marketing, and uses a referral program and word of mouth to attract buyers.

US dealerships and automotive dealership disputes

, there are stores and galleries—usually located in shopping malls—in 29 US states and Washington DC. Customers can buy vehicles from stores, as well as from the Tesla website. The stores serve as showrooms that allow people to learn about the company and its vehicles. Some galleries are located in states with restrictive dealership protection laws which prevent discussing price, financing, and test drives, as well as other restrictions. Tesla has set up mobile-shipping-container "stores" and 6 Airstream travel trailers each pulled by a Model X, reaching areas not served by brick-and-mortar shops.

Tesla's strategy of direct customer sales and owning stores and service centers is different from the standard dealership model in the US vehicle marketplace. Tesla is the only manufacturer that currently sells cars directly to customers; all other automakers use independently owned dealerships although some automakers provide online configuration and financing. Forty-eight states have laws that limit or ban manufacturers from selling vehicles directly to consumers, and although Tesla has no independent dealerships, dealership associations in multiple states have filed numerous lawsuits against Tesla, to prevent the company from selling cars. North Carolina and New Hampshire sided with Tesla, while Virginia and Texas sided with dealers.

Jurisdictions outside the United States do not have such laws protecting car dealerships.

The laws against direct sales arose historically in the United States starting in the 1930s, as automobile manufacturers started using independently franchised dealerships to offload the tasks of retail selling and servicing vehicles. The laws have been actively defended into the 21st century and extended to online in-state sales. Such regulations protect dealerships against a manufacturer opening its own dealerships and competing against resellers, which could be seen as an abuse of the manufacturer-franchise relationship. Critics view the laws as thwarting legitimate competitive pressure that benefits consumers, and some have described them as "protectionism", and "crony capitalism".

The Federal Trade Commission recommends allowing direct manufacturer sales, which a 2000 report by a Goldman Sachs analyst projected would save consumers an average of $2,225 on a $26,000 car. In May 2014, a report prepared by Maryann Keller and Kenneth Elias for the National Automobile Dealers Association claims that franchises (such as offered by its members) offer better value for customers than direct sales.

Independent dealerships typically earn more money from service than from sales, so the lower maintenance requirements of electric vehicles can provide a financial incentive for selling gas-powered vehicles, to Tesla's disadvantage. Investigations by Consumer Reports and the Sierra Club found that independent dealers often could not answer questions about electric cars, did not provide information about government rebates, did not showcase the cars prominently, or let the batteries run out.

States with total direct sales bans

New Mexico (also bans service centers)
2006 New Mexico Statutes, Section 57-16-5-V prohibits manufacturers like Tesla to be licensed as a dealer, directly or indirectly performing warranty or other services. Despite Tesla owners' pleas to change the law, they still currently depend on out-of-state centers such as Arizona and Colorado for Tesla sales and services.

In January 2019, the Public Affairs Committee approved the Tesla-friendly Senate Bill 243, but it died on the Senate Corporations and Transportation Committee calendar. House Bill 294 died in the House Commerce and Economic Development Committee.

In August 2021 Tesla opened their first store and service center in the state on Nambé Pueblo tribal land north of Santa Fe.

Alabama (also bans service centers)
Alabama regards manufacturer-owned new motor vehicle stores and service centers as "unfair and deceptive trade practices". In August 2016 State Senator Tom Whatley introduced Senate Bill 22, assigned to the Senate Tourism and Marketing Committee, which would allow a manufacturer of alternative fuel vehicles to sell and lease its vehicles directly to the public. The bill died in committee.

South Carolina (also bans service centers)
South Carolina bans manufacturer ownership of new car dealerships and manufacturer service/repair of cars they do not own. A bill was introduced in 2019 to allow electric only manufacturers to sell in the state. However, Tesla does offer mobile service in the state.

Louisiana 
Louisiana enacted a law in June 2017 that bans direct to consumer sales of vehicles. A service center is planned in New Orleans.

Texas
Texas law states "Except as provided by this section, a manufacturer or distributor may not directly or indirectly:(1) own an interest in a franchised or nonfranchised dealer or dealership;(2) operate or control a franchised or nonfranchised dealer or dealership; or(3) act in the capacity of a franchised or nonfranchised dealer. (Tex. Occ. Code Ann. § 2301.476) and "A motor vehicle shall not be advertised for sale in any manner that creates the impression that it is being offered for sale by the manufacturer or distributor of the vehicle. An advertisement shall not contain terms such as “factory sale,” “fleet prices,” “wholesale prices,” “factory approved,” “factory sponsored,” “manufacturer sale,” use a manufacturer's name or abbreviation in any manner calculated or likely to create an impression that the vehicle is being offered for sale by the manufacturer or distributor, or use any other similar terms which indicate sales other than retail sales from the dealer" (43 Tex. Admin. Code § 215.261).

These laws make it illegal to buy a car from Tesla in person, at a Tesla Gallery. Thus, all Texas orders are taken via the internet or over the phone. Texas residents can still easily buy a car from Tesla, but the purchase is handled as an out-of-state transaction and must be completed before the vehicle ships to Texas. Tesla recently added the ability to include tax, title, license, and registration in the sale price of the car so the purchaser doesn't have to pay that separately once they receive the vehicle. In 2015, Tesla lobbied the Texas Legislature to modify the law to allow Tesla to sell directly to consumers, and specifically allow Tesla employees to discuss "financing, leasing, or purchasing options" at the firm's existing galleries in Austin, Dallas, and Houston. Texas considered legislation in 2015 to allow Tesla to operate in the state but legislation was not passed.

, most of the GOP delegates support direct sales while Governor Abbott prefers the current system. According to Texans for Public Justice, Tesla spent $1.3m on lobbyists while dealerships spent $1m.

Connecticut
Connecticut does not allow manufacturer direct sales, but does allow direct leasing. Tesla operated a gallery in Greenwich that the Connecticut Automotive Retailers Association successfully got shut down via a lawsuit. In March 2018, Tesla was appealing a ruling that they operate the Greenwich gallery as an unlicensed dealership, but later dropped the appeal. The gallery was shut down in March 2019. In December 2019, Tesla started offering leases at their showrooms which allowed them to provide test drives for customers discussing leases.

In 2015, 2016, 2017, and 2018 bills were introduced in the legislature to allow licensing electric vehicle manufacturers as dealers.

In March 2021, Connecticut state bill, SB-127 (the EV Freedom Bill), that would allow all EV makers to sell directly to their customers, passed out of the General Assembly's Transportation Committee and awaited a vote by the full state house and senate.

The Session Year 2022 bill is Senate Bill number 214. The bill was reported on favorably by the Transportation Committee on March 14, 2022 by a vote with 21 yeas to 14 nays.

West Virginia
West Virginia does not allow Tesla-owned stores or showrooms.

In January 2019, House Bill 2219 was introduced that would allow a manufacturer to be licensed and operate as a new motor vehicle dealer if the company only sells zero-emissions vehicles and only manufactured since 2008.

Wisconsin
Auto manufacturers are not allowed to sell directly to the public under Wisconsin law. In late 2017 a legislative bill named "Electric Vehicle Freedom Act" was introduced to allow only electric vehicle manufactures to sell directly. The bill is opposed by the Wisconsin Automobile Dealers & Truck Association.

Nebraska
Nebraska prohibits auto manufacturer direct sales, but Legislative Bill 830 was introduced in 2018 in an attempt to change the law.

There is a new bill being pushed into Legislation from Vargas again. LB51 - Change license applications, prohibited acts, and franchise restrictions under the Motor Vehicle Industry Regulation Act. On January 8, 2020 - Title printed. Carryover bill. In August 2020, LB51 was indefinitely postponed.

Oklahoma
Oklahoma currently bans direct sales by auto manufacturers, but legislation was introduced in February 2018 to attempt to allow it.

States with limited sales

Mississippi (1 store)
On March 14, 2023, Governor Tate Reeves of Mississippi signed HB401, which bans direct sales of EVs by manufacturers.  Tesla's existing Brandon location will be "grandfathered in".

Virginia (2 stores, approval for 3 more)
In Virginia Tesla has obtained license from the Department of Motor Vehicles (DMV) for a single direct sales dealership (Tysons Corner). Upon learning of Tesla's attempt to obtain a second dealership in the state, the Virginia Automobile Dealers Association filed a lawsuit in March 2016 against both Tesla and the DMV to prevent the licensing of the second dealership. In September 2016, the Virginia Department of Motor Vehicles (VDMV) recommended ending Tesla direct sales, as at least 11 dealerships were interested in selling Tesla vehicles. The VDMV later allowed Tesla to open another shop (Richmond), as Tesla has no dealerships to compete against; the 11 interested dealerships would not be able to compete on undiscounted prices, as Tesla has the same price online and in shops. Third-party profits could come from servicing as is traditional, but Tesla already has satisfactory servicing.

In July 2021, Tesla won approval from the Virginia Department of Motor Vehicles to open three new stores in Charlottesville, Norfolk and Arlington.

Ohio (3 store limit)
In December 2013, days before Tesla was to open its first store in Ohio, a one line amendment to a draft bill was proposed at the urging of the Ohio Automobile Dealers Association that would have prevented Tesla from selling directly to the public in the state. This amendment was dropped a day later. A group of auto dealers then sued the state to try to get Tesla's license rescinded. This suit was dismissed less than two months later. Shortly thereafter a legislative bill was introduced that would ban all manufacturers from owning dealerships, not just those with existing franchisees. A deal reached between Tesla and the Ohio Automobile Dealers Association in March 2014 allowed Tesla to have three stores but blocks all other auto manufacturers. The Ohio Senate approved the bill in April.

New Jersey (4 store limit)
On March 10, 2014, it was announced that New Jersey Motor Vehicle Commission and Governor Chris Christie's administration would be holding a meeting to pass a new proposal into law. This new proposal, PRN 2013–138, was announced one day before it was to be put into law. Tesla responded by saying that the proposal "seeks to impose stringent licensing rules that would, among other things, require all new motor vehicles to be sold through middlemen and block Tesla's direct sales model", and that "[Governor Christie's] Administration has decided to go outside the legislative process by expediting a rule proposal that would completely change the law in New Jersey." The law was passed, and "Tesla will no longer [be able to] sell electric cars in New Jersey, effective April 1". Diarmuid O'Connell, Tesla Vice President of Business Development, said, "Worse, it has done so without any reasonable notice or even a public hearing." Forbes contributor Mark Rogosky said, "The state's new rules protect its auto dealers from having to compete with Tesla's direct sales model"; he points out that this is a direct contrast from what Christie said earlier, "We are for a free-market society that allows your effort and ingenuity to determine your success, not the cold, hard hand of the government." Kevin Roberts, a spokesman for the Christie administration, responded by saying "it was the [Tesla Motors] company, not the governor's office, that was attempting to bypass normal procedures.".

In March 2015, a new state law was signed allowing zero-emission vehicle manufacturers to sell at up to four locations and requiring a minimum of one service center.

2018 session Senate bill No. 3493 was introduced to increase the number of allowed sales locations to 14 by 2023, but increases the mandated retail service facilities to seven. It died in committee.

In September 2019, the New Jersey auto dealers' association, the New Jersey Coalition of Automotive Retailers, sued Tesla and the state to stop Tesla from selling cars by its current methods in the state.

Maryland (4 store limit)
In May 2015, Maryland approved, through House Bill 235, direct Tesla sales to customers beginning in October 2015, though limiting the statewide number of stores to only four. The legislation was crafted specifically for Tesla and allows only four manufacturers of electric or non-fossil fuel burning vehicles without existing franchisees to be licensed to sell direct to the public.

Pennsylvania (5 store limit)
Pennsylvania enacted a law in 2014 that allows Tesla to open up to five stores.

New York (5 store limit)
In 2014, New York banned direct sales but grandfathered in five Tesla stores. Tesla operates four galleries in addition to its five stores.

There is proposed legislation (Senate bill S6600A and Assembly bill A8248A) to allow more stores. The Eastern New York Coalition of Automotive Retailers is opposed to this as is the Rochester Automobile Dealers Association.

Georgia (5 store limit)
Since 2015, Georgia law no longer restricts Tesla to 150 car sales per year but limits sales to five locations.

North Carolina (6 store limit)
Tesla's first store in North Carolina was in Raleigh. In 2016 the state would not grant Tesla a dealer license for a second location in Charlotte. A previous legislative bill that would allow six Tesla stores was shelved in 2017. In July 2019 a bill was passed allowing Tesla to operate a maximum of six stores, unlimited galleries and repair centers.

States for which Tesla gained the right to mostly unrestricted direct sales

New Hampshire (2013 law change)
In 2013, New Hampshire passed legislation to allow auto manufacturers with no existing franchise dealer in the state to engage in direct sales.

Minnesota (2013 law interpretation)
The Minnesota Department of Public Safety ruled in 2013 that the original dealer law "does not prohibit a manufacturer from becoming licensed as a dealer in Minnesota". The dealership association in the state failed in their attempt to get the law changed to block Tesla.

Washington (2014 law)
A 2014 Washington state law outlawed direct sales but grandfathered in Tesla.

Massachusetts (2014 court ruling)
After an almost two year court battle with the Massachusetts State Automobile Dealers Association, a September 2014 ruling by the Massachusetts Supreme Judicial Court allowed Tesla to begin selling directly in the state. The court ruled the law only protected franchise dealers from abuse by manufacturers they already buy from; since no franchise dealers were selling Teslas at the time of the suit, the court ruled the Association had no standing to sue.

Missouri (2017 court ruling)
A Missouri circuit court ruled in August 2016 to end direct sales, confirmed in late December 2016, and delayed in early January while the Missouri Department of Revenue appeals the former verdict. In December 2017 an appeals court reversed the circuit court's decision, saying the Missouri Automobile Dealers Association did not have standing to sue. However, the Dealers Association is backing new legislation that would allow it to sue.

Wyoming (2017 law change)
Wyoming banned direct sales until a law change in 2017 that created a direct sale manufacturer's license. Electric cars were seen as a way to promote the use of coal mined in the state.

Arizona (2017 court ruling)
Arizona blocked direct sales until June 2017 when an administrative law judge ruled that the Arizona Department of Transportation interpreted the law incorrectly. This was after a years-long legal battle by Tesla.

Indiana (2017 law change)
Indiana allows a service center and manufacturer sales for 30 months, ending direct Tesla sales by the end of 2017. A legislative proposal had further restrictions, opposed by Tesla. The Roads and Transportation committee approved a modification that grandfathered Tesla, but maintained the ban on all new direct sales by other automakers.

Rhode Island (2017 law interpretation)
In December 2017, Tesla was granted a license by the state of Rhode Island after DMV lawyers concluded that the law blocking direct auto sales only applied to manufacturers that have franchise dealers. Tesla planned to begin sales in 2018 in Warwick, but this was pushed back to 2019.

Utah (2018 law change)
As of March 21, 2018, Utah Governor Herbert signed a bill into law allowing Tesla direct sales in the state.

Michigan (2020 legal settlement)
After a change of political leadership in Michigan's executive branch, on January 22, 2020, Tesla and the state of Michigan agreed to settle Tesla's 2016 federal lawsuit against the state for unfair vehicle sales and service restrictions. The agreement allows Tesla to sell and service cars within the state. Previously Tesla could not sell or service vehicles in Michigan. Tesla may deliver vehicles within the state, but they must be titled outside of Michigan and transferred to a new title after purchase. Tesla may not own a service center directly, but a wholly owned subsidiary may own a service center.

Colorado (2020 law change)
Tesla opened its first and only Colorado store in Boulder in 2009. A 2010 revision to the state dealership law removed the word "franchised". This closed the loophole that Tesla had used to open a direct dealership but grandfathered in the existing single store. This limitation was supported by the Colorado Automobile Dealers Association. The store moved from Boulder to the Park Meadows shopping mall in Lone Tree in 2011.

Showrooms/galleries have since been opened in Aspen, Vail, and the Cherry Creek Shopping Center in Denver, though these have since closed. There is a service center in Denver and a service center and showroom in Littleton.

A large service center and store was built in Superior, Colorado in Boulder County, targeted for spring 2019 opening, and opened in February 2020. It shut down again in December 2021 as a result of damage incurred during the Marshall Fire.

A bill to allow direct sales died in the House in 2019, for which the Colorado Auto Dealers Association claimed credit.

A changed law (via Senate Bill 20–167) in March 2020 allows EV-only manufacturers to sell direct in Colorado.

Surveys
In 2014, Consumer Reports performed a mystery shopper survey of 19 secret shoppers in 85 dealerships, querying electric vehicles. Most shoppers found it to be a positive experience, although 35 dealerships recommended gasoline cars instead, and 13 discouraged EVs. The most knowledgeable dealerships were Chevrolet, and the least were Toyota.

In 2016, two shopper surveys showed contrasting shopping experiences between Tesla and traditional dealerships. One performed by the environmental organization Sierra Club found that in 14% of traditional dealerships, their electric cars were not charged to test drive, and 33% did not discuss the $7,500 Federal tax credits.

Another study by industry analyst Pied Piper using mystery shoppers found that Tesla sales stores (not galleries) differed among each other on sales techniques, and many stores were reluctant to engage in closing a sale.

Customers generally view car shopping as a challenging experience.

In May 2019, Sierra Club revisited dealerships, and found that 74% did not offer electric vehicles. Those that did, were mostly in states with requirements for zero-emission vehicles. A 2019 study indicates that only 10% of Americans have significant knowledge of EVs.

References

External links 
 Tesla Direct Sales Map (US) and collection of state laws at Tesla Motors Club forum

dealership disputes
Auto dealerships of the United States
Business rivalries
Politics of the United States